Joseph Thomas Callahan (October 8, 1916 – May 24, 1949) was a professional baseball pitcher. He played parts of two seasons in Major League Baseball, 1939 and 1940, for the Boston Bees.

Callahan died on May 24, 1949, of cerebral embolism complicated by rheumatic heart disease and pneumonia.

References

External links

Major League Baseball pitchers
Boston Bees players
Albany Senators players
Erie Sailors players
Evansville Bees players
Kansas City Blues (baseball) players
Portland Beavers players
Little Rock Travelers players
People from East Boston, Boston
Baseball players from Boston
1916 births
1949 deaths
Deaths from cerebral embolism
Deaths from pneumonia in Massachusetts